The 1941 Memphis State Tigers football team was an American football team that represented Memphis State College (now known as the University of Memphis) as a member of the Southern Intercollegiate Athletic Association during the 1941 college football season. In their third season under head coach Cecil C. Humphreys, Memphis State compiled a 6–3 record.

Schedule

References

Memphis State
Memphis Tigers football seasons
Memphis State Tigers football